María Esther Saavedra Yoacham (August 8, 1928 – August 13, 2017) was a Chilean beauty pageant titleholder who was crowned Miss Chile 1952 becoming the first-ever winner of the Miss Chile competition.

In 1952, Esther earned the first Miss Chile, becoming the official representative for Chile in the first Miss Universe pageant, which was held on 28 June 1952 at the Long Beach Municipal Auditorium in California.

Esther died on August 13, 2017, in Santiago, at the age of 89. According to El Mercurio, her funeral was at 1:00 pm in the General Cemetery.

References

1928 births
2017 deaths
Miss Universe 1952 contestants
Miss Universo Chile winners
People from Santiago
Chilean beauty pageant winners